Foma Gordeyev or The Man Who Was Afraid (Gordeev) [] is an 1899 novel by Maxim Gorky.

It was first published by Zhizn magazine in February-September 1899 and came out as a separate edition  in 1900, as part of the Zhizn Library (vol.3), with a dedication to Anton Chekhov.

Foma Gordeyev or The Man Who Was Afraid was translated by Isabel F. Hapgood in 1901.

Background 
Gorky started working on Foma Gordeyev in 1898. "It is supposed to present the broad and true picture of the contemporary life, while featuring the figure of an  energetic, healthy man, craving for space to realize his power's potential. He feels restricted. Life smothers him. He realizes that there is no place for heroes in it, they apt to being defeated by small things, like Hercules, the conqueror of hydras, crashed by hordes of mosquitoes," he wrote in a February 1898 letter to the publisher S. Dorovatsky. Gorky considered his hero an atypical figure in the context of Russian merchant community. "Foma is just a sprightly man looking for freedom but feeling thwarted by life's conventions," he wrote in the same letter, promising to soon embark upon another novel, telling by way of redressing the balance, the life of a 'true' tradesman, a smart and cynical crook, going by the name of Mikhail Vyagin (the project never materialized). In his correspondence Gorky complained about numerous cuts made by the governmental censors. He radically revised the text twice, in 1900 and 1903.

Reception 
The novel was highly rated among the socialist critics and writers. Jack London in his review writes: "Foma Gordyeeff" is a big book--not only is the breadth of Russia in it, but the expanse of life. Yet, though in each land, in this world of marts and exchanges, this age of trade and traffic, passionate figures rise up and demand of life what its fever is, in "Foma Gordyeeff" it is a Russian who so rises up and demands. For Gorky, the Bitter One, is essentially a Russian in his grasp on the facts of life and in his treatment. All the Russian self-analysis and insistent introspection are his. And, like all his brother Russians, ardent, passionate protest impregnates his work."

Adaptations 
The eponymous Soviet film by Mark Donskoy, based on the novel, came out in 1959.

References

External links
 Фома Гордеев, 1959, by Mark Donskoy, starring Georgy Epifantsev

1899 Russian novels
Novels by Maxim Gorky
Novels set in 19th-century Russia